Harold Vincent Mackintosh, 1st Viscount Mackintosh of Halifax LL.D (8 June 1891 – 27 December 1964) was a British businessman, public servant and benefactor.

Early life
Mackintosh was born in Halifax, West Riding of Yorkshire, the son of John and Violet Mackintosh who had a toffee factory on Queens Road in Halifax, then Albion Mills and also in the United States, Canada, Germany and Australia. He was educated at Halifax New School. Instead of going to university, he spent a few years in Krefeld in North Rhine-Westphalia, Germany where he ran a Mackintosh toffee factory, and learnt the language. He was a member of the German international hockey team, prior to the First World War. During the First World War, he joined the Royal Naval Volunteer Reserve.

Career
Mackintosh was the owner of the confectionery business of John Mackintosh & Sons Ltd from 1920 when his father died of a heart attack. The company John Mackintosh & Sons Ltd was floated in March 1921. He was involved in the amalgamation of a group of Halifax building societies into the Halifax Building Society in 1928. In September 1931, he narrowly avoided merging the company with Rowntrees of York. Both companies already had a joint subsidiary in the Republic of Ireland.

As a result of a lunchtime meeting at the Savoy Hotel, he bought the A. J. Caley confectionery company in Norwich from Unilever in 1932. The Caleys site is now the Chapelfield shopping centre. This takeover of Caleys helped the Mackintosh company to expand its range of products notably changing its reliance on toffee to products with chocolate toffee such as Quality Street in 1936 and Rolo. To launch Quality Street, he had a full-page advertisement on the front of the Daily Mail on 2 May 1936. His brother Eric managed the Caleys factory. He was Chairman of the National Savings Committee from 1943, becoming president in 1958. In 1956, under his leadership, National Savings introduced Premium Bonds. He served as Chancellor of the University of East Anglia between 1962 and 1964.

Recognition
Mackintosh was knighted in the 1922 New Year Honours, when only 31, one of the youngest people to be knighted in the 20th century, for his work with Sunday schools. He was made a baronet in the 1935 New Year Honours and was raised to the peerage in the 1948 New Year Honours as Baron Mackintosh of Halifax, of Hethersett in the County of Norfolk. In the 1957 Birthday Honours, he was further honoured when he was made Viscount Mackintosh of Halifax, of Hethersett in the County of Norfolk. In 1948, he was given an honorary LLD by the University of Leeds. On Unthank Road in Norwich is Harold Mackintosh House.

Personal life
On 8 June 1916, Mackintosh married Constance Emily Stoneham, the second daughter of Edgar Cooper Stoneham, OBE. She was born on the same day as him, and they had three children: Harold, John (born 7 October 1921) and Mary. Mackintosh was a devout Methodist. He was a keen supporter of the Sunday School Movement, becoming President of the National Sunday School Union from 3 May 1924 until 1925, then World Sunday School Association. In December 1927 he became President of the Yorkshire Agricultural Society. In 1960 he became President of the Royal Norfolk Agricultural Association. From 1942 to 1946, he was President of the Advertising Association. He also supported the British Empire Cancer Campaign. He had a large collection of Toby jugs, and had an extensive knowledge of Ralph Wood and Staffordshire pottery.

His son John attended an American university as he felt no British university was prepared to the necessary standard in Business Administration. From 1934 to 1942, he lived at Conynghan Hall near Harrogate. Then they lived at Greystones in Luddenden. In 1947, he moved to Thickthorn Hall, south-west of Norwich. He died at Thickthorn Hall, aged 73, in Norwich, leaving £218,404 in his will. His wife died in 1975.

His portrait, by the famous Scottish portrait artist Cowan Dobson is held at the University of East Anglia at Norwich.

Publications
 Early English Figure Pottery, 1938

References

External links

 Biography
 Early history of Mackintosh May 2008 Halifax Courier

|-

|-

1891 births
1964 deaths
Chancellors of the University of East Anglia
English Methodists
Knights Bachelor
People from Halifax, West Yorkshire
Royal Naval Volunteer Reserve personnel of World War I
Barons created by George VI
Viscounts created by Elizabeth II
20th-century English businesspeople
Royal Naval Reserve personnel